Tomeurus gracilis is a species of poeciliid fish native to South America, in Brazil, Surinam and Venezuela.  This species grows to a length of  TL.  It is the only known member of its genus. This species is classified in the tribe Cnesterodontini in the 5th edition of Fishes of the World. but other workers place it in its own tribe, the Tomeurini.

This is a sociable fish which lives in small schools consisting of several dozens of fishes. It is found in muddy creeks or along the sandy-muddy edges of shallow estuaries. It has been observed remaining still just below the surface but it prefers to hide beneath aquatic plants. Fertilisation is internal and, uniquely among the Poeciliinae, the females may then lay eggs placing them  individually onto aquatic plants. They can also be facultively ovoviviparous.

References

Poeciliidae
Fish of South America
Taxa named by Carl H. Eigenmann
Ray-finned fish genera
Monotypic freshwater fish genera